The 2015 European Modern Pentathlon Championships was held in Bath, Great Britain from 17 to 23 August 2015.

The event was a direct qualification event for the 2016 Summer Olympics, with the eight highest finishers in the men's and women's individual events gaining quota places for their National Olympic Committee at the 2016 Games.

Medal summary

Men's events

Women's events

Mixed events

Medal table

References

External links
Results

2015
2015 in modern pentathlon
2015 in British sport
Modern pentathlon
August 2015 sports events in the United Kingdom
Modern pentathlon competitions in the United Kingdom
International sports competitions hosted by the University of Bath